Ambla River is a river in Järva County, Estonia. The river is 27.9 km long and basin size is 157.7 km2. It runs from Roosna Lake into Jägala River.

References

Rivers of Estonia
Järva County